The Princess Who Never Smiled, The Unsmiling Tsarevna or The Tsarevna who Would not Laugh (Tsarevna Nesmeyana) is a Russian folk fairy tale collected by Alexander Afanasyev in Narodnye russkie skazki, as tale number 297.

Synopsis
There was once a princess who never smiled or laughed. Her father promised that whoever made her smile could marry her, and many tried, but none succeeded.

Across the town, an honest worker worked hard for his master. At the end of the year, the master put a sack of money before him and told him to take as much as he wanted. To avoid sinning by taking too much, he took only one coin, and when he went to drink from a well, he dropped the coin and lost it. The next year, the same thing happened to him. The third year, the worker took the same amount of coin as before, but when he drank from the well, he did not lose his coin, and the other two coins floated up to him. He decided to see the world. A mouse asked him for alms; he gave him a coin. Then he did the same for a beetle and a catfish.

He came to the castle and saw the princess looking at him. This astounded him, and he fell in the mud. The mouse, the beetle, and the catfish came to his aid, and at their antics, the princess laughed. She pointed him out as the man, and when he was brought into the castle, he had been turned into a handsome man. The honest worker, now a handsome man, married the princess.

Translations
The tale was translated as The Princess Who Never Smiled.

Analysis

Tale type
The Russian tale is classified - and gives its name - to the East Slavic type SUS 559, of the East Slavic Folktale Classification. The East Slavic type corresponds to tale type ATU 559, "Making the Princess Laugh (The Dungbeetle)", of the international Aarne-Thompson-Uther Index. In this tale type, the poor boy wins the hand of the princess through a bizarre presentation of small creatures and bugs that makes her laugh.

Scholar Stith Thompson explained that the name of the tale type is due to the presence of the dung beetle "in nearly all versions of the narrative".

Motifs
Making the princess laugh, or smile, is a common fairy tale motif of various uses. The culmination of Golden Goose and The Magic Swan (both classified as ATU 571, "All Stick Together"), where the goose or swan causes other characters to stick to each other, is that the sight causes a princess to laugh for the first time. The result is ultimately the princess' marriage in each of these stories. Peruonto and the frame story of Giambattista Basile, however, depict stories where someone who has been laughed at casts a curse on the princess to force her to marry someone.

Before the edition of Antti Aarne's first folktale classification, Svend Grundtvig developed - and later Astrid Lunding translated - a classification system for Danish folktales in comparison with other international compilations available at the time. In this preliminary system, two folktypes were grouped together based on "essential characteristics": folktypes 20A Hold fast! ("Stick to! [The Golden Goose]") and 20B Skellebasserne ("The Scarabees"). Both tales were grouped under the banner "The Princess who can not help laughing".

Variants
An early literary version of the tale type was published in Pentamerone, with the title Lo scarafone, lo sorece e lo grillo ("The Scarab, the Mouse and the Cricket").

In an "Irish fairy tale" compiled by authors Ada M. Skinner and Eleanor L. Skinner, How Timothy Won the Princess, a poor widow sends her son Timothy to sell her three white cows to put food on the table. However, the boy becomes delighted by the performance of a dwarf man, who produces a tiny mouse, a cockroach and a bee - all dressed in fine clothes - to play and dance for the crowd. Fascinated by the little creatures, he trades the cows for them and takes them home. His mother looks disappointed in him, even after he shows her the strange little animals. Some time later, the boy uses the little musicians to make the princess laugh and ends up marrying her.

Retellings
A Sesame Street Book Club book entitled The Sesame Street Alphabet Storybook (which interspersed different objects starting with subsequent letters into infamous stories as told by Sesame Street characters) included a quick telling of "The Princess who Never Laughed" using a xylophone and yo-yo's (X and Y) as props used by two people trying to make the princess laugh to no avail. It comes to end when Cookie Monster, who was lurking behind them, ate both items, which the princess did think was funny.

A 1978 episode of Yeralash retells the story by having a king order his prime minister to make his daughter laugh. A number of real-life comedians are summoned, including Gennady Khazanov and Oleg Popov, but all fail. Then the minister brings forth a young boy to sit at the royal table, and his complete lack of manners does make everyone laugh, including the princess.

References

Further reading
 Pöge-Alder, Kathrin. "Mistkäfer (AaTh 559)" In: Enzyklopädie des Märchens Online. Edited by Rolf Wilhelm Brednich, Heidrun Alzheimer, Hermann Bausinger, Wolfgang Brückner, Daniel Drascek, Helge Gerndt, Ines Köhler-Zülch, Klaus Roth and Hans-Jörg Uther. Berlin, Boston: De Gruyter, 2016.

External links

 The original text of the tale at Wikisource
 Farie Tale Theatre and TV Show; The Princess Who Had Never Laughed (1986)

Russian fairy tales
Fairy tales collected by Alexander Afanasyev
Fictional princesses
Fiction about shapeshifting
Fiction about magic
Laughter
Works about marriage
Female characters in fairy tales
ATU 500-559